The Pointe du Tsaté is a mountain of the Swiss Pennine Alps, overlooking Les Haudères in the canton of Valais. It lies between the valleys of Hérens and Moiry (part of Val d'Anniviers). On its east side is the lake of Moiry.

References

External links
 Pointe du Tsaté on Hikr

Mountains of the Alps
Alpine three-thousanders
Mountains of Switzerland
Mountains of Valais